William Mitchell House is a historic home located near Ahoskie, Hertford County, North Carolina.  It was built about 1832, and is a two-story, five bay by two bay, "L"-shaped Federal style frame dwelling, with Greek Revival style design elements. It has a shallow gable roof and brick pier foundation. Also on the property are the contributing office, schoolhouse, carriage house, and smokehouse.  It was the home of William Mitchell, one of the founders of Chowan University.

It was listed on the National Register of Historic Places in 1972.

References

Houses on the National Register of Historic Places in North Carolina
Federal architecture in North Carolina
Greek Revival houses in North Carolina
Houses completed in 1832
Houses in Hertford County, North Carolina
National Register of Historic Places in Hertford County, North Carolina